The Blackest Curse is a studio album by American hardcore punk band Integrity. it was released on June 8, 2010 through Deathwish Inc. The Blackest Curse is a concept album based on a book written by frontman Dwid.

Track listing

References

2010 albums
Integrity (band) albums
Deathwish Inc. albums